Caithness may refer to:

 Caithness (county of Scotland)
 Caithness (local government district, Highland region)
 Caithness (UK Parliament constituency)
 Earl of Caithness